50 Years of Comparative Wealth E.P. was a 1981 7-inch EP released by Steve Diggle of Buzzcocks. This was his first disc released in his solo career and without Buzzcocks, who by those days were disbanding (although bassist Steve Garvey and drummer John Maher, both also from the band, remained with Diggle). Shortly afterwards Garvey dedicated to his proper projects, with his band Motivation, while Diggle and Maher formed punk band Flag of Convenience, but Maher also left Diggle after some releases.

Track listing
All songs were written by Steve Diggle

A-side
"Shut Out the Light (Rothko)"

B-side
"Fifty Years of Comparative Wealth"
"Here Comes the Fire Brigade (Riot)"

Personnel
 Steve Diggle – vocals, guitar, keyboards
 Steve Garvey – bass
 John Maher – drums
Technical
 John Brierley – engineer
Philip Diggle – cover art

External links
 Discogs.com: Steve Diggle – 50 Years Of Comparative Wealth E.P.
Discogs.com: Philip Diggle

1981 debut EPs
Liberty Records albums